Callender is a surname of Scottish origin. Notable people with the surname include:

A
Arthur Callender, assistant to Howard Carter during the excavation of Tutankhamun's tomb

C
Charles Callender, owner of blackface minstrel shows in 19th century America
Claire Callender, British academic
Clarence Callender, athlete
Colin Callender, English television producer

E
Emmanuel Callender, athlete
Eugene Callender (1926–2013), American pastor and activist

J
James T. Callender, late 18th and early 19th century journalist
Jamie Callender, American politician
John Callender, Scottish psychiatrist and philosopher
John Callender, English footballer

M
Mary Pauline Callender, author of puberty and menstruation advice booklets in the 1920s and 1930s used to promote Kotex products

R
Reg Callender (1892–1915), English footballer
Robert Callender, Canadian cricketer

References

Surnames of Scottish origin